The Trouble with Being Born may refer to:
 The Trouble with Being Born (book), a 1973 work by Emil Cioran
 The Trouble with Being Born (film), a 2020 drama film by Sandra Wollner